Aryabhata, named after Indian astronomer Aryabhata, is the remnant of a lunar impact crater located in the eastern Mare Tranquillitatis. The crater has been almost submerged by lava-flow, and now only an arc-shaped ridge formed from the eastern half of the rim remains above the lunar mare. This crater was previously identified as Maskelyne E before being named by the IAU in 1979. Maskelyne itself is to the southwest.

References

External links
 LTO-61D2 Aryabhata, Lunar Topographic Orthophotomap (LTO) Series

Impact craters on the Moon